Francis Edgar Harris (17 December 1899 – December 1983) was an English footballer. His regular position was at full back. He was born in Urmston, Manchester. He played for Manchester United.

External links
MUFCInfo.com profile

1899 births
1983 deaths
English footballers
Manchester United F.C. players
People from Urmston
Association football fullbacks